Oglala Lakota County (known as Shannon County until May 2015) is a county in southwestern South Dakota, United States. The population was 13,672 at the 2020 census. Oglala Lakota County does not have a functioning county seat; Hot Springs in neighboring Fall River County serves as its administrative center. The county was created as a part of the Dakota Territory in 1875, although it remains unorganized. Its largest community is Pine Ridge.

The county lies entirely within the Pine Ridge Indian Reservation and contains part of Badlands National Park. It is one of five South Dakota counties entirely on an Indian reservation.

The county is named after the Oglala Lakota, a band of the Lakota people. Many of the county's inhabitants are members of this sub-tribe.

Reservation poverty affects the county, which is the poorest county in the continental US. (28 county-equivalents in the U.S. territories are poorer). Oglala Lakota County is the only dry county in South Dakota.

The newspaper for Oglala Lakota County is The Lakota Country Times.

History
The Wounded Knee Massacre occurred in Oglala Lakota County in 1890.

The county was originally named for Peter C. Shannon, Chief Justice of the Dakota Territory Supreme Court. Until 1982, Shannon County and Washabaugh County, South Dakota, were the last unorganized counties in the United States. Although it was organized and received a home rule charter that year, the county, as noted above, contracts with Fall River County for its Auditor, Treasurer, and Registrar of Deeds.

On November 4, 2014, voters in the county voted by a margin of 2,161 to 526 to rename Shannon County to Oglala Lakota County.
The name change was ratified by the state legislature on March 5, 2015. May 1, 2015 was proclaimed by the governor as the official day for renaming the county.

Geography

Oglala Lakota County lies on the south side of South Dakota. Its south boundary line abuts the north boundary line of the state of Nebraska. The Cheyenne River flows northeastward along the northwest boundary of Oglala Lakota County. The White River flows northeastward through the central part of the county. The county terrain is composed of semi-arid rolling hills spotted with small mountain crests, oriented NE-SW. The terrain slopes to the northeast; its highest point is on the south boundary line, close to the SW corner, at 3,619' (1103m) ASL.

The county includes the headwaters of the Little White River.

Major highways

  U.S. Highway 18
  South Dakota Highway 40
  South Dakota Highway 391
  South Dakota Highway 407

Adjacent counties

 Pennington County - north
 Jackson County - northeast
 Bennett County - east
 Sheridan County, Nebraska - south
 Dawes County, Nebraska - southwest
 Fall River County - west
 Custer County - northwest

National protected area
 Badlands National Park (part)

Lakes

 Alkali Lake
 Denby Lake
 Lee Lake
 Oglala Lake
 Two Lance Lake
 Wakpamani Lake
 White Clay Lake

Source:

Demographics

As of the 2000 United States Census, there were 12,466 people, 2,785 households, and 2,353 families residing in the county. The population density was 6 people per square mile (2/km2). There were 3,123 housing units at an average density of 2 per square mile (1/km2). The racial makeup of the county was 4.51% White, 0.08% Black or African American, 94.20% American Indian, 0.02% Asian, 0.05% Pacific Islander, 0.22% from other races, and 0.91% from two or more races. Hispanic or Latino of any race were 1.42% of the population.

There were 2,785 households, out of which 51.70% had children under the age of 18 living with them, 35.40% were married couples living together, 36.40% had a female householder with no husband present, and 15.50% were non-families. 13.20% of all households were made up of individuals, and 3.00% had someone living alone who was 65 years of age or older. The average household size was 4.36 and the average family size was 4.72.

The county population contained 45.30% under the age of 18, 10.60% from 18 to 24, 25.60% from 25 to 44, 13.80% from 45 to 64, and 4.80% who were 65 years of age or older. The median age was 21 years. For every 100 females there were 99.60 males. For every 100 females age 18 and over, there were 95.60 males.

The median income for a household in the county was $20,916, and the median income for a family was $20,897. Males had a median income of $25,170 versus $22,594 for females. The per capita income for the county was $6,286. About 45.10% of families and 52.30% of the population were below the poverty line, including 60.80% of those under age 18 and 36.00% of those age 65 or over.

Health and life expectancy
Of 3,142 counties in the United States in 2014, Oglala Lakota County ranked last in the life expectancy of both male and female residents. Males in Oglala Lakota County lived an average of 62.8 years and females lived an average of 71.0 years compared to the national average for life expectancy of 76.7 for males and 81.5 for females. The average life expectancy in Oglala Lakota County increased by 6.2 for males and  4.1 years for females between 1980 and 2014, compared to an increase in the national average for the same period of an increased life span of 6.7 years for men and 3.9 years for women.

In 2021, the Robert Wood Johnson Foundation ranked Oglala Lakota County last of 61 counties in South Dakota in "health outcomes," as measured by length and quality of life.

Politics
The counties surrounding Oglala Lakota County are predominantly Republican, but, like most Native American counties, residents of Oglala Lakota are mostly Democrats, giving over 75 percent of the vote to every Democratic presidential nominee in every election back to 1984, making it one of the most Democratic counties in the United States. No Republican has carried the county in a presidential election since 1952. In 2012, Oglala Lakota County (then known as Shannon) was the county with the highest percentage of vote for Barack Obama in the United States. However, the local politics are a bit more divided: Oglala Lakota County lies within the 27th District of the South Dakota Legislature, represented by three Lakotas, two Democrats and one Republican. Democrat Red Dawn Foster represents the county in the Senate, while Democrat Peri Pourier and Republican Steve Livermont represent the county in the House.

Communities

Town
 Batesland

Census-designated places

 Kyle
 Manderson-White Horse Creek
 Oglala
 Pine Ridge
 Porcupine
 Wounded Knee

Unincorporated communities
 Denby
 Red Shirt
 Rockyford
 Sharps Corner

Townships
There are no townships. The county is divided into two areas of unorganized territory: East Oglala Lakota and West Oglala Lakota (formerly East Shannon and West Shannon, respectively).

See also
 List of counties in South Dakota
 National Register of Historic Places listings in Oglala Lakota County, South Dakota

References

External links

 

 
South Dakota placenames of Native American origin
1875 establishments in Dakota Territory
Populated places established in 1875